The 2015 Scandinavian Touring Car Championship was the fifth Scandinavian Touring Car Championship season. The season started at the new circuit in Skövde Airport on 8 May and ended on 26 September at Ring Knutstorp, after seven rounds. It was the third year of TTA – Racing Elite League silhouette regulations in the series following the merge of the STCC and TTA at the end of the 2012 season. Thed Björk entered the season as the defending drivers' champion and successfully defended his title. Volvo Polestar Racing will be the defending teams' champion. Both Björk and Volvo Polestar Racing retained their titles after the season.

Teams and drivers
All teams were Swedish-registered.

Race calendar and results
All rounds will be held in Sweden.

Championship standings

Drivers' Championship

Notes:
† — Drivers did not finish the race, but were classified as they completed over 70% of the race distance.

Teams' Championship

References

External links
 

2015 in motorsport
2015 in Swedish motorsport